"Shakin' in Them Boots" is a song recorded by Canadian country music singer Jade Eagleson. Shakin’ in Them Boots is a #1 single from upcoming his third studio album. The song was written by James Barker of the James Barker Band along with Blake Pendergrass and Jacob Durrett, while Todd Clark produced the track.

Background
Eagleson described the song as a "fun one" that is driven by the fiddle, while adding that "there aren’t a ton of up-tempo songs out there that have country roots like this" which is why he knew he "had to put it out". He stated that he and his band love to play the song live and remarked that he hoped listeners would "have as much fun listening to it as we’ve been having playing it".

Critical reception
Migs Lava of Canadian Beats Media reviewed the song favourably, saying that it "brings the sounds of Eagleson’s traditional seven-piece band to life with the harmonies of the timeless neo-traditional country he’s become known for". James Daykin of Entertainment Focus called the track a "barn burner" that is "sure to get anyone’s toe tapping during the first listen," adding that it "will naturally fall into the next line dancing playlist with its fast paced, swingin’ round the room tempo."

Music video
The official music video for "Shakin' in Them Boots" premiered on CMT on November 14, 2022. The video was directed by Ben Knechtel, and produced by Silent K. Eagleson remarked that he believed the video "brings the song to life by how energetic it is from start to finish," adding that "the song itself is very fast-paced and upbeat, and the video matches that perfectly" and that he always wanted to "release a song we could do a proper two-step to". He remarked that he admired how Shania Twain would tell the story of her songs in her videos and how he "wanted to bring some of that energy into this project".

Charts

References

2022 songs
2022 singles
Jade Eagleson songs
Songs written by James Barker (singer)
Song recordings produced by Todd Clark